Hellinsia hebrus is a moth of the family Pterophoridae. It is found in Costa Rica.

The wingspan is 23 mm. The forewings are shining silvery white and the markings are grey‑brown. The hind wings are grey‑white and the fringes are white.

References

Moths described in 1932
hebrus
Moths of Central America